Gliese 49 is a star in the northern constellation of Cassiopeia. Visually, it is located 106 arc minutes north of the bright star γ Cassiopeiae. With an apparent visual magnitude of 9.56, it is not observable with the naked eye. It is located, based on the reduction of parallax data of Gaia, 32.1 light-years away from the Solar System. The star is drifting closer to the Sun with a radial velocity of −6 km/s.

This object is a red dwarf star of spectral type M1.5V. Much dimmer than Sun, it has a total luminosity that is 4.9% that of the Sun; it is, however, much brighter than other nearby red dwarfs such as Proxima Centauri or Wolf 359. Its mass is 52% that of the Sun, and 51% of its radius.

It rotates on its axis with a projected rotation speed of under 2 km/s, and has a rotation period of 18.86 days. It has a metallic content similar to that of the Sun, with its index of metallicity [M / H] = +0.03. Although its age is not known exactly, it is less than 250 million years.

Gliese 49 has a similar proper motion to the red dwarf flare star V388 Cassiopeiae. Both stars are associated with the Hyades, as suggested by its young age and chromospheric activity levels.

Planetary system 
One known planet is known to orbit Gliese 49. Gliese 49 b is a super-Earth planet detected by the radial velocity method.

References

M-type main-sequence stars
Cassiopeia (constellation)
0049
004872
Planetary systems with one confirmed planet
Durchmusterung objects